The 1980 Western Michigan Broncos football team represented Western Michigan University in the Mid-American Conference (MAC) during the 1980 NCAA Division I-A football season.  In their sixth season under head coach Elliot Uzelac, the Broncos compiled a 7–4 record (6–3 against MAC opponents), finished in second place in the MAC, and outscored their opponents, 233 to 179.  The team played its home games at Waldo Stadium in Kalamazoo, Michigan.

The team's statistical leaders included Tom George with 644 passing yards, Craig Morrow with 778 rushing yards, and Reggie Hinton with 429 receiving yards. Defensive end Jim Hinkle and tackle Bud Sitko were the team captains. Defensive back George Bullock received the team's most outstanding player award.

Schedule

See also
 1980 in Michigan

References

Western Michigan
Western Michigan Broncos football seasons
Western Michigan Broncos football